Amerila is a genus of moths in the subfamily Arctiinae. A number of species in this genus have a special defence mechanism when they are in their adult stage. When disturbed, they exude a frothy yellow fluid from glands beside the eyes, while making a sizzling noise to ward off their attacker. Similar behaviour has been observed in fertilised females of the North-American moth Utetheisa ornatrix.

The genus is placed in a monotypic tribe Amerilini, described by Vladimir Viktorovitch Dubatolov in 2010. They are sometimes (e.g. in the "Erebidae" scheme) incorrectly merged into the Phaegopterini, but morphologically the tribe is related to Callimorphini. The elder name Rhodogastriini Kiriakoff, 1950 was based on incorrectly determined genus Rhodogastria (=Amerila in modern sense).

Species
 Amerila abdominalis (Rothschild, 1933)
 Amerila accra (Strand, 1919)
 Amerila affinis (Rothschild, 1910)
 Amerila alberti (Rothschild, 1910)
 Amerila albivitrea (Hampson, 1901)
 Amerila aldabrensis (Fryer, 1912)
 Amerila androfusca (Pinhey, 1952)
 Amerila arthusbertrand (Guérin-Méneville, 1830)
 Amerila astreus (Drury, 1773)
 Amerila bauri (Möschler, 1884)
 Amerila bipartita (Rothschild, 1910)
 Amerila brunnea (Hampson, 1901)
 Amerila bubo (Walker, 1855)
 Amerila castanea (Hampson, 1911)
 Amerila catinca Häuser et Boppre, 1997
 Amerila cynira (Muller, 1980), nomen nudum
 Amerila crokeri (MacLeay, 1826)
 Amerila curta (Rothschild, 1917)
 Amerila erythropus (Rothschild, 1917)
 Amerila eugenia (Fabricius, 1794)
 Amerila femina (Berio, 1935)
 Amerila fennia (Druce, 1887)
 Amerila fumida (Swinhoe, 1901)
 Amerila fuscivena (Hampson, 1916)
 Amerila howardi (Pinhey, 1955)
 Amerila kiellandi Häuser et Boppre, 1997
 Amerila kuehni (Rothschild, 1910)
 Amerila lactea (Rothschild, 1910)
 Amerila leucoptera (Hampson, 1901)
 Amerila lineolata (Kiriakoff, 1954)
 Amerila lucida (Muller, 1980), nomen nudum
 Amerila lupia (Druce, 1887)
 Amerila luteibarba (Hampson, 1901)
 Amerila madagascariensis (Boisduval, 1847)
 Amerila magnifica (Rothschild, 1910)
 Amerila makadara Häuser et Boppre, 1997
 Amerila mulleri Häuser et Boppre, 1997
 Amerila myrrha (Muller, 1980), nomen nudum
 Amerila nigrivenosa (Grünberg, 1910)
 Amerila nigroapicalis (Aurivillius, 1900)
 Amerila nigropunctata (Bethune-Baker, 1908)
 Amerila niveivitrea (Bartel, 1903)
 Amerila omissa (Rothschild, 1910)
 Amerila phaedra Weymer, 1892
 Amerila piepersii Snellen, 1879
 Amerila puella (Fabricius, [1794])
 Amerila rhodopa Walker, 1865
 Amerila roseomarginata (Rothschild, 1910)
 Amerila rubripes Walker, 1865
 Amerila rufifemur (Walker, 1855)
 Amerila rufitarsis (Rothschild, 1917)
 Amerila serica Meyrick, 1886
 Amerila shimbaensis Häuser et Boppre, 1997
 Amerila simillima (Rothschild, 1917)
 Amerila syntomina (Butler, 1878)
 Amerila thermochroa (Hampson, 1916)
 Amerila timolis (Rothschild, 1914)
 Amerila vidua (Cramer, 1780)
 Amerila vitrea Plötz, 1880

Incorrectly placed species 
 Amerila atrivena Hampson, 1907 (in Dubatolovia, Spilosomini)
 Amerila hersilia Druce, 1887 (in Caryatis, Nyctemerini)
 Amerila phileta (Drury, 1782) (in Caryatis, Nyctemerini)
 Amerila stenoperas Hampson, 1910 (in Caryatis, Nyctemerini)

Note 
Caryatis species are not morphologically related to Amerila.

References 
 , 2009: Reviewing the African tiger-moth genera: 1. A new genus, two new subgenera and a species list from the expedition to Malawi by V. Kovtunovich & P. Ustjuzhanin in 2008-2009, with further taxonomic notes on South African Arctiinae. Atalanta 40 (1-2): 285-301.
 , 2010: Tiger-moths of Eurasia (Lepidoptera, Arctiidae) (Nyctemerini by ). Neue Entomologische Nachrichten 65: 1-106, Marktleuthen.
 , 1995: The Afrotropical Tiger-Moths. An illustrated catalogue, with generic diagnosis and species distribution, of the Afrotropical Arctiinae (Lepidoptera: Arctiidae): 1-55, Apollo Books Aps.: Stenstrup, Denmark.
 , 1996: Arctiidae: 278-286, 368-370. In:  Monographs on Australian Lepidoptera 4: xiv+529, CSIRO: Melbourne.
 , 1997: A revision of the Afrotropical taxa of the genus Amerila Walker (Lepidoptera, Arctiidae). Systematic Entomology 22 (1): 1-44.
 , 1989: A Generic Classification of the Subfamily Arctiinae of the Palaearctic and Oriental Regions based on the Male and Female Genitalia (Lepidoptera, Arctiidae) Part I. Tyô to Ga 38 (3): 153-237. Abstract and full article: .

External links
Natural History Museum Lepidoptera generic names catalog

Amerilini
Moth genera